Laglan is a rural locality in the Isaac Region, Queensland, Australia. In the  Laglan had a population of 3 people, but its boundaries have subsequently changed.

Geography 
The Great Dividing Range runs roughly along the western boundary of Laglan.

Laglan has the following mountains in the east of the locality:

The predominant land use is grazing on native vegetation.

History 
Yagalingu (also known as Jagalingu, Auanbura, Kokleburra, Owanburra, Kowanburra, Wagalbara, and Djagalingu) is an Australian Aboriginal language of Central Queensland. Its traditional language region was within the local government area of Isaac Region, from the headwaters of the Belyando River south to Avoca, north to Laglan, west to the Great Dividing Range, and east and south to Drummond Range.

In the  Laglan had a population of 3 people.

On 17 May 2019, it was decided to discontinue the locality of Mistake Creek and absorb its land into the neighbouring localities of Clermont, Laglan, Frankfield and Peak Vale.

Economy 
There are a number of homesteads in the locality, including:

 Bimbah East
 Doongmabulla
 Laglan
 Lestree Downs
 Lou Lou Park

Transport 
Doongmabulla Airstrip is at the Doongmabulla homestead.

Laglan Airstrip is at Laglan homestead.

Education 
There are no schools in Laglan and none nearby. Distance education and boarding schools are options.

References 

Isaac Region
Localities in Queensland